Łódź Heat Power Stations, also known under the company name of Veolia Energia Łódź S.A. are combined heat and power stations in Łódź, Poland. They are operated by Veolia Energia Łódź.

They are 2 operating heat and power stations in Łódź.

References

Coal-fired power stations in Poland
Cogeneration power stations in Poland
Buildings and structures in Łódź
Companies based in Łódź
Energy infrastructure completed in 1958
Energy infrastructure completed in 1968
Energy infrastructure completed in 1977